Independence Avenue may refer to:
 Independence Avenue (Minsk), Belarus
 Independence Avenue (Santiago de Chile), Chile
 Independence Avenue (Washington, D.C.), United States
 Independence Avenue (Windhoek), Namibia